Bernardo Sousa Pereira Brites Martins (born 4 December 1997) is a Portuguese professional footballer who plays for Vilafranquense as a midfielder.

Club career
Born in Porto, Martins made his professional debut with Leixões on 14 August 2016 as an 18th-minute substitute in a LigaPro 1–0 away loss to Cova da Piedade.

On 26 January 2019, Martins joined LigaPro side Benfica B along with Leixões teammate Pedro Henrique. Months later, he moved to Paços de Ferreira in Primeira Liga on a three-year contract.

References

External links

Stats and profile at LPFP 

1997 births
Living people
Footballers from Porto
Portuguese footballers
Association football midfielders
Liga Portugal 2 players
Campeonato de Portugal (league) players
Primeira Liga players
FC Porto players
Rio Ave F.C. players
Leixões S.C. players
C.D. Trofense players
S.L. Benfica B players
F.C. Paços de Ferreira players
G.D. Chaves players
S.C. Covilhã players
U.D. Vilafranquense players